Pizzo del Diavolo di Tenda is a mountain of Lombardy, Italy. It is located within the Bergamo Alps. It is the highest peak of the Val Brembana.

Mountains of Lombardy
Mountains of the Alps